Sarah Cracknell (born 12 April 1967) is an English singer-songwriter and lead singer of the electronic music band Saint Etienne.

Career
Cracknell's career started with the Windsor-based indie band The Worried Parachutes in 1982. Following the demise of the band she released a solo single, Love Is All You Need, in 1987. With friend Mick Bund, she then formed a new band, Prime Time, who released a handful of singles. She appeared on 1990 dance track Fingertips by Lovecut DB.

Saint Etienne was originally to be an indie dance act featuring various vocalists.  After Moira Lambert sang on their initial 1990 single "Only Love Can Break Your Heart" and Donna Savage was heard on the follow-up single "Kiss and Make Up", Cracknell lent her vocals to "Nothing Can Stop Us" and ended up doing the rest of the singing on their debut album Foxbase Alpha.  Cracknell has been Saint Etienne's permanent vocalist since then.

Preceded by the single "Anymore" in 1996, Cracknell released a solo album, Lipslide, in May 1997.  Originally released in the UK only by Gut Records, the album featured dance, indie and pop tunes and received good reviews from critics, but was not a big seller (Cracknell has in interviews placed some of the blame on lack of proper promotion by Gut).

Lipslide finally surfaced in the U.S. three years later, when Instinct Records released it in February 2000.  With completely different cover art, the original album's track listing was also modified: five tracks were removed and four new songs plus a remix were added.  Months later, Instinct released the Kelly's Locker EP, which contained the five tracks originally removed from the UK version of Lipslide, along with two previously unreleased songs and a new remix.

Cracknell was Spiller's first choice for the vocals of his number-one hit "Groovejet (If This Ain't Love)" in 2000, but never got to record the song.  She has recorded tracks with various artists such as David Holmes ("Anymore", "Gone"), Xploding Plastix ("Sunset Spirals"), Cheapglue ("You've Just Won Me Over") and Paul Van Dyk ("The Riddle (Tell Me Why)," although billed as a collaboration between Van Dyk and St. Etienne but with Cracknell on vocals).

She recorded a duet of Dusty Springfield's 1968 song "I Close My Eyes and Count to Ten" with Marc Almond for his album Stardom Road, released in June 2007.

In December 2007, BBC radio began playing "The Journey Continues" by Mark Brown featuring Cracknell. The song consists of extensive samples from a composition by Elena Kats-Chernin entitled Eliza's Aria, well known to UK TV viewers as the music from the computer-animated 'For the Journey' commercials for Lloyds TSB bank. The single was released in February 2008 on Positiva. The song peaked at #11 in the UK after being released.

Cracknell has collaborated with French pop star Etienne Daho on several occasions. She co-wrote and sang back-up vocals on "Les passagers" from his 1996 album Eden, and also co-wrote "Le premier jour" which was released as a single from his greatest hits compilation Singles. With Saint Etienne, they collaborated on the Reserection EP. Saint Etienne's single "He's on the Phone" (which featured both Cracknell and Daho) was actually an English-language adaptation of Daho's French language 1984 single "Weekend à Rome".

On 21 August 2014, Cherry Red Records announced that it had signed Cracknell to a worldwide deal under which she would release a new solo album.  The album, entitled Red Kite, was recorded in December 2014 and released on 15 June 2015.  A series of live shows by Cracknell in support the album were planned for the weeks following its release.

Personal life
Cracknell married Martin Kelly (joint managing director of Heavenly Recordings and Heavenly Films) in Kensington and Chelsea, London on 5 December 2004. They have two children, born in Westminster, London in 2001 and 2004.

Cracknell is the daughter of Stanley Kubrick's first assistant director Derek Cracknell and actor and singer Julie Samuel (born 1944).

Discography

The discography consists of two studio albums, two compilations, six solo singles and four singles as a featured artist.

Albums

Studio albums

Compilation albums

Singles

As lead singer

As featured artist

Guest appearances

References

External links
 Sarah Cracknell Discography

1967 births
Living people
Alternative rock singers
Alternative dance musicians
British alternative rock musicians
British indie pop musicians
English dance musicians
English electronic musicians
English house musicians
English women singer-songwriters
Musicians from Essex
Gut Records artists
Synth-pop singers
English women pop singers
English women in electronic music
Instinct Records artists